Jürgen Melzer was the defending champion, but lost in the first round to Igor Sijsling.
Kei Nishikori won the title, defeating Feliciano López in the final, 6–2, 6–3.

Seeds

Draw

Finals

Top half

Bottom half

Qualifying

Seeds

Qualifiers

Lucky losers
  Michael Russell

Draw

First qualifier

Second qualifier

Third qualifier

Fourth qualifier

References
 Main Draw
 Qualifying Draw

U.S. National Indoor Tennis Championships - Singles
2013 Men's Singles